Anatoly Mikhailovich Karelin (16 July 1922  3 January 1974) was a Soviet MiG-15 flying ace during the Korean War, credited with six to eight victories for which he was awarded the title Hero of the Soviet Union.

Awards
 Hero of the Soviet Union (14 July 1953)
 Two Order of Lenin (21 June 1952 and 14 July 1953)
 Two Order of the Red Banner (25 September 1952 and 22 February 1968)
 Order of the Red Star (30 December 1956)
 Medal "For Battle Merit" (13 June 1952)

See also 
List of Korean War flying aces

References

Sources 

People from Kurgan Oblast
Communist Party of the Soviet Union members
Russian aviators
Russian people of World War II
Soviet Korean War flying aces
Soviet military personnel of the Korean War
Heroes of the Soviet Union
Recipients of the Order of the Red Banner
Soviet Air Force generals
1922 births
1974 deaths
Soviet major generals
Burials at Serafimovskoe Cemetery
Military Academy of the General Staff of the Armed Forces of the Soviet Union alumni